Within the United States, a commercial mail receiving agency (CMRA) is a private business that accepts mail from the Postal Service on behalf of third parties. A CMRA may also be known as a mail drop.

A customer of a CMRA can receive mail and other deliveries at the street address of the CMRA rather than the customer's own street address.  Depending on the agreement between the customer and the CMRA, the CMRA can forward the mail to the customer or hold it for pickup.

Unlike a post office box, a CMRA operates independently of the national postal administration and is therefore able to receive courier packages or other non-mail. CMRAs typically provide ancillary services such as facsimile, copy or courier.

A customer may wish to use the services of a CMRA for privacy.  A customer in one community may contract with a CMRA in another community with a better known or more prestigious address. A business located near an international border may use a CMRA as a point of local presence to receive cross-border freight or correspondence at domestic (instead of international) rates.

The use of a CMRA may render the delivery of mail at a later time of day than it would at a Post Office box. Some CMRAs offer a virtual mailbox, or online post office, providing a means to access mail over the internet.

History 
In 1970, there were estimated to be as many as 1,500 CMRAs, costing on average $7 per month for a small mailbox. The private mailbox business grew as a result of shortage of P.O. Boxes.

As of 2000, the USPS regulated 466 private mailboxes in New York City alone.

Use as a business address
Most business entities are required to register an official mailing address with the state, and that address is part of the public record. A business's use of an invalid address or an inappropriate third party as its official mailing address could result in legal problems, such as the loss of limited liability protection. If a business does not want to disclose its physical location, it may permissibly use a CMRA as its publicly known address.

Fraud alert
Any person or entity claiming to receive postal mail for a third-party must be properly licensed and registered with the US Postal Service, and such an entity must properly fill out USPS Form 1583.  There are specific requirements all CMRA's must adhere to, including granting certain rights to CMRA customers.  Any entity, including third-party registered agent services, permitting you to forward mail to them without following CMRA requirements should be viewed as a red-flag.  This could be inadvertently exposing important mail, including checks and credit cards, to an unauthorized entity.

Examples
 iPostal1.com (Company)
 PhysicalAddress.com (Company)
 The UPS Store
 Mail Boxes Etc.
 PostNet (company)

See also
 Virtual office
 Customs broker
 Freight forwarder
 Post office box
 Private Mail Bag
Virtual mailbox

References

Postal systems